This article describes the first cabinet led by Petre Roman, which was formed 26 December 1989 and dissolved 28 June 1990.

Members

Prime Minister
Petre Roman

Deputy Prime Ministers
Gelu Voican Voiculescu
Mihai Drăgănescu
Ion Aurel Stoica
Anton Vătășescu

Ministers of State
Petru Pepelea
Mihail Victor Buracu
Costică Bădescu
Ovidiu Adrian Moțiu

Ministers
Teofil Pop (Justice)
Niculae Militaru/Victor Athanasie Stănculescu (Defense)
Andrei Pleșu (Culture)
Nicolae Ștefan (Agriculture and Food Industry)
Sergiu Celac (Foreign Affairs)
Mihai Chițac/Doru Viorel Ursu (Interior)
Mihai Șora (Education)
Simion Hâncu (Environment)
Alexandru Dimitriu (Constructions)
Mihnea Marmeliuc (Labor)
Corneliu Burada (Transport)
Dan Enăchescu (Health)
Stelian Pintilie (Posts and Telecommunications)
Victor Athanasie Stănculescu (National Economy)
Adrian Georgescu (Electric Energy)
Gheorghe Caranfil (Chemical and Petrochemical Industry)
Anton Vătășescu (Electrotechnics, Electronics and Informatics)
Victor Murea (Oil Industry)
Ioan Cheșa (Metallurgical Industry)
Constantin Popescu (Light Industry)
Ioan Aurel Stoica (Motor Industry)
Ioan Folea (Geology)
Nicolae Dicu (Mines)
Ion Râmbu (Woodworking Industry)
Nicolae M. Nicolae (Foreign Trade)
Mihai Lupoi (Tourism)
Nicolae Stoicescu (Religious Affairs)
Mircea Angelescu (Sports)

Roman I Cabinet
Romanian Revolution
1989 establishments in Romania
1990 disestablishments in Romania
Cabinets established in 1989
Cabinets disestablished in 1990